Harichandapuram is an Indian village and panchayat, located in Kotabommali mandal in Srikakulam district, Andhra Pradesh, India.

Chinna Harichandrapuram is also known for Sri Panchadama kshetram Hindu Temple.

Sai Baba Temple 

Vana Durga Ammavaru Temple 

Lord Shiva Temple

Demographics
According to Indian census, 2001, the demographic details of Harichandrapuram village is as follows:
 Total Population: 	4,324 in 970 Households
 Male Population: 	2,138 and Female Population: 	2,186
 Children Under 6-years of age: 614 (Boys - 	303 and Girls -	311)
 Total Literates: 	1,935

Assembly constituency
Harishchandrapuram is an assembly constituency in Andhra Pradesh.

List of Elected Members:

 1967 - Krishna Murthy Kinjarapu
 1972 and 1978 - Kannipally Appla Narasimha Bhuktha
 1983, 1985, 1989 and 1994 - Yerrannaidu Kinjarapu.
 1999 and 2004 - Atchan Naidu Kinjarapu.

Transport 
Panchadama Kshetram 
Harischandrapuram is located on National Highway 16 (India). Harishchandrapuram railway station is in Chennai-Howrah mainline of East Coast Railway, Indian Railways. Passenger trains that run from Palasa towards Visakhapatnam halt at Harishchandrapuram station.

APSRTC Runs buses to Harischandrapuram Junction , which is located on National Highway 16 (India) .
Panchadama Kshetram
Harishchandrapuram railway station is 3 kilometers far away from Harishchandrapuram village . Harishchandrapuram junction on National Highway 16 (India) is 2 kilometers away from Harishchandrapuram village.

APSRTC Bus from Tekkali - Ummilada village and Ummilada village - Narasannapeta travel through this village.

Remaining APSRTC busses , Autos , taxis are available at Harishchandrapuram junction , Which is located on National Highway 16 (India) .

References

Villages in Srikakulam district

Sri Panchadama Kshetram 
Harishchandrapuram